Vasos y besos (Glasses and kisses) is the second studio album of Argentine rock group Los Abuelos de la Nada (The Grandfathers Out of Nowhere). It was released in 1983. Among the songs that stand out are the hits No se desesperen (Don't Lose Hope) and "Mil horas" (A Thousand Hours); the latter is considered by some to be emblematic of Argentine rock.

In 2007, the Argentine edition of Rolling Stone ranked it 29 on its list of "The 100 Greatest Albums of National Rock".

Track listing 

 No se desesperen [Don't Lose Hope] (Gustavo Bazterrica) (4:57)
 Así es el calor [That's Heat] (Andrés Calamaro/Gringui Herrera) (2:38)
 Yo soy tu bandera [I'm Your Flag] (Miguel Abuelo/Cachorro López) (2:49)
 Sintonía americana [American Tune] (M.Abuelo/C.López) (3:09)
 Espía de Dios [God's Spy] (M.Abuelo/G.Bazterica) (2:20)
 Cucarachón de tribunal [Court Cockroach] (G.Bazterica) (3:29)
 Vamos al ruedo [Let's Get Going] (C.López/A.Calamaro) (3:32)
 Mil horas [A Thousand Hours] (Andrés Calamaro) (2:50)
 Hermana Teresa [Sister Teresa] (M.Abuelo/C.López) (3:04)
 Chalamán (Daniel Melingo) (4:05)
 Mundos inmundos [Unworldly Worlds] (M.Abuelo) (4:32)

Musicians 

 Miguel Abuelo: lead vocals, percussion
 Andrés Calamaro: keyboards, vocals
 Cachorro López: bass, backup vocals
 Gustavo Bazterrica: guitar, vocals
 Daniel Melingo: saxophone, clarinet, vocals
 Polo Corbella: drums

References

1983 albums